The 2012 Richmond Spiders football team represented the University of Richmond in the 2012 NCAA Division I FCS football season. They were led by first-year head coach Danny Rocco and played their home games at E. Claiborne Robins Stadium. They were a member of the Colonial Athletic Association. They finished the season 8–3, 6–2 in CAA. Due to Old Dominion (7–1 in CAA play) being ineligible for the conference title, the Spiders claimed a four way share of the CAA title. Despite the conference title, the Spiders were not invited to the FCS playoffs.

Schedule

Source: Schedule

References

Richmond
Richmond Spiders football seasons
Colonial Athletic Association football champion seasons
Richmond Spiders football